The 1916 United States presidential election in Idaho took place on November 7, 1916 as part of the 1916 United States presidential election in which all contemporary forty-eight states participated. State voters chose four electors, or representatives to the Electoral College, who voted for president and vice president.

Background
At state level, Idaho had begun in 1902 to be very much a one-party Republican state, which it has largely remained since apart from the New Deal era of the 1930s and 1940s. For a time there was also a perception that the William Jennings Bryan-led Democratic Party had failed as a “party of reform”.

In 1912, Woodrow Wilson had carried Idaho by 1.06 points with less than one third of the total vote due to severe divisions within the GOP between conservative incumbent William Howard Taft and Progressive former President Theodore Roosevelt. In contrast to the East where supporters of Theodore Roosevelt's "Bull Moose" Party rapidly returned to the Republicans, in the Mountain States many if not most of these supporters turned to the Democratic Party not only in presidential elections, but also in state and federal legislative ones. Another factor helping Wilson was a powerful "peace vote" in the Western states due to opposition to participation in World War I, and a third was that a considerable part of the substantial vote for Eugene Debs from the previous election was turned over to Wilson owing to such Progressive reforms as the Sixteenth and Seventeenth Amendments.

The consequence of these trends was that Idaho would vote strongly for Wilson over Republican nominee Charles Evans Hughes, who was viewed as an easterner who epitomized the oligarchic interests so suspect in the Mountain States. Wilson gained almost twenty percent upon his 1912 performance, and carried all but five counties.

Results

Results by county

See also
 United States presidential elections in Idaho

References

Idaho
1916
1916 Idaho elections